The Bleckley County School District is a public school district in Bleckley County, Georgia, United States, based in Cochran. It serves the communities of Cary, Allentown, and Cochran.

Schools
The Bleckley County School District has one primary school (Pre-K - 2nd Grade), one elementary school (grades 3-5), one middle school (grades 6-8), one high school (grades 9-12), and one alternative school (grades 6-12).

Primary School

 Bleckley County Primary School (Grades Pre-K through 2nd)

Elementary school
Bleckley County Elementary School (Grades 3-5)

Middle school
Bleckley County Middle School (Grades 6-8)

High school
Bleckley County High School (Grades 9-12)

Alternative School

 Bleckley County Success Academy (Grades 6-12)

References

External links

School districts in Georgia (U.S. state)
Education in Bleckley County, Georgia